The Dream of Zorro (Italian: Il Sogno di Zorro) is a 1952 Italian comedy adventure film directed by Mario Soldati and starring Walter Chiari, Delia Scala and Vittorio Gassman. The future star Sophia Loren had a minor role in the film.

The film's sets were designed by Guido Fiorini.

Plot 
A direct descendant of the legendary Zorro, an elderly gentleman has an only son named Raimondo (Walter Chiari), in whom there is no trace of the original pride of his ancestors. Raimondo is a shy and fearful young man, who has become this way since he was a child, following a terrible fall, in which he hit his head. When the father invites a friend with his daughter to his farm, whom he intends to marry Raimondo, the latter has such a childish and foolish demeanor that everything is upset. Chased out of the house he decides to enter the convent, but on the way he meets a powerful gentleman who conspires against the Governor and, involved in the melee between them and his opponents, Raimondo is hit in the head. Raimondo immediately recovers the daring ancient spirits: he transforms himself into a skilled swordsman - as well as an ardent seducer - and, by throwing himself against the lord's opponents, he routs them and defeats them. Full of gratitude, the gentleman, who is a duke and was wounded, entrusts him with a mission of all trust. Raimondo should go to the palace of a powerful opponent of the duke, whose daughter Estrella (Delia Scala) must marry and pretend to be the duke himself. Raimondo carries out the task, to the point of falling in love with the girl and passing victorious through the limitless traps set by his opponents. Meanwhile, Estrella is kidnapped and, after ups and downs, Raimondo recaptures the girl. With her intervention, the young man makes the duke's cause triumph, who, finally appointed governor, renounces her to Estrella, granting her in marriage to the heroic Raimondo. "Zorro's dream" is finally crowned.

Cast
Walter Chiari as Don Raimundo Esteban  
 Delia Scala as Gloria / Estrella / Dolores  
 Vittorio Gassman as Don Antonio / Juan  
 Carlo Ninchi as Don Esteban Contrero
 Umberto Aquilino as José  
 Anna Arena as La Locandiera  
 Sandro Bianchi as Pablo / Ramon  
 Pietro Capanna as Manuel  
 Giorgio Costantini as Capitano  
 Juan de Landa as César / Pedro  
 Augusto Di Giovanni as Don Formoso  
 Giovanni Dolfini as Don Alonzo  
 Claudio Ermelli as Maestro di Musica  
 Giacomo Furia as Panchito 
 Sophia Loren as Conchita (as Sofia Scicolone) 
 Michele Malaspina as Perez 
 Gisella Monaldi as Luisa / Consuelo 
 Guido Morisi as Ignazio 
 Luigi Pavese as Don Garcia Fernandez 
 Michèle Philippe as Maria / Marta 
 Riccardo Rioli as Notaio 
 Gualtiero Tumiati as Don Cesar Alcazan 
 Nietta Zocchi as Dona Hermosa Alcazan

External links
 

1952 films
1950s adventure comedy films
1952 Western (genre) films
Italian adventure comedy films
1950s Italian-language films
Films directed by Mario Soldati
Zorro films
Films with screenplays by Ruggero Maccari
Films scored by Mario Nascimbene
1952 comedy films
Films with screenplays by Mario Amendola
Italian black-and-white films
Films based on works by Johnston McCulley
1950s American films
1950s Italian films